IDIS (054800:KS) is a security technology company based in South Korea. It is headquartered just outside of Seoul and operates globally through regional offices and key strategic partners. IDIS has more than two million recorders installed worldwide and more than 16.5 million cameras use IDIS technology. The company has twice been named one of the 200 "best under a billion" by Forbes.

History
IDIS was founded in 1997 by Y.D. Kim, Albert Ryu, and J.H. Jeong, as Intelligent Digital Integrated Security Co., Ltd., with a focus on digital video recording (DVR) technology. The company quickly grew, gaining certification as a "Technology Venture Oriented Company" in 1999, and a listing on the KOSDAQ stock exchange in 2001. The company also became the number one seller of DVRs in the surveillance industry, as an Original Design Manufacturer/Original Equipment Manufacturer (ODM/OEM) for leading surveillance solution providers.

In the mid-2000s, the company began a series of in-house innovations and acquisitions that expanded the company's focus beyond DVRs to include next-generation camera and network video recording (NVR) offerings and industrial display technologies. In 2013, IDIS implemented changes to its business and began to transition away from being a supplier of manufactured goods to other companies and towards selling its own branded products. As part of this change, IDIS launched a branded security solution, DirectIP™, at the 2013 IFSEC International security exhibition in Birmingham, United Kingdom. The company subsequently launched DirectIP and other components of the IDIS Total Solution in the Middle East in 2014, at the Intersec exhibition in Dubai, United Arab Emirates, and the Americas in 2015, at the ISC West trade show in Las Vegas, Nevada. At each regional launch, the company debuted regional headquarters and staff dedicated to the sale and support of IDIS branded offerings in those areas.

Currently, Dr. Y.D. Kim serves as CEO of IDIS.

Products

IDIS designs, develops, and manufacturers cameras, recorders across different technology platforms, software, and monitors for display. The company's self-described "IDIS Total Solution" is delivered via three primary offerings: DirectIP, IDIS Solution Suite, and DirectCX.

DirectIP, introduced at the 2013 IFSEC Security show in London, is the company’s flagship offering a plug-and-play, single-source range of HD cameras, NVRs, and monitors—including 4K UHD and support for H.265. IDIS Solution Suite is a full featured video management system (VMS) universally compatible with recording platforms, designed to be responsive and cost-effective by using a modular format, where customers only purchase the feature sets they need, such as recording, backup, redundant recording, failover, and video wall services. DirectCX is IDIS's HD-TVI offering, providing FHD over coaxial cabling, with support for HD-TVI 2.0. DirectCX cameras, recorders, and IDIS Solution Suite are designed to complement existing investments in coaxial cabling, if a complete remake of surveillance technology is not desired. A common, virtually-identical user interface (GUI) across all IDIS products is a distinguishing feature promoted by the company.

Innovation
IDIS was an early pioneer in digital video recording, leading the security industry's shift from VCR recording to DVR technology, growing to become the world's top selling provider of DVRs to the security marketplace.  IDIS held this position until the company's strategic shift in focus toward the development and sale of latest-generation NVR and IP technologies in the mid-to-late 2010s.

Additional technical milestones include IDIS's release of RAS, a mobile remote review for mobile phones and PDA in 2007, INC (featured on the D1 IP Camera) and MMX, a mini-matrix switcher, in 2008. In 2009, IDIS developed and launched ISP100, a H.264 based image processing IC for DVRs as well as iNEX, a VMS.

The company's proprietary DirectIP technology has resulted in numerous accolades and recognition for IDIS, and was named "Technology Innovation of the Year" at the 2014 PSI Premier Awards in London, England. DirectIP was also recognized with highest honors at the inaugural Korea High-Tech Safety Industry Product & Technology Awards, in recognition of "DirectIP’s contributions to solving the difficult problems, compatibility challenges and connectivity issues facing the network surveillance market."

In 2015, the IDIS Super Fisheye Camera received multiple industry accolades for technological performance and innovation upon release, and in 2016, the company debuted  "Smart UX" controls for point-and-zoom technology, aiming to increase accuracy and ease of use for camera operators. The product was named by Security Products magazine in the United States as a "New Product of the Year" later that same year.

IDIS's focus on simplifying user experiences while improving fundamental surveillance qualities (such as image clarity) important to end-users has been regularly remarked upon by security industry media. In 2015, industry editor Larry Anderson specifically noted the company's "timely emphasis on end-to-end IP solutions that are 'plug-and-play'" in covering the company's debut in the North American market. Benchmark Magazine, in a 2015 review of the IDIS Fisheye camera, noted the company's high performance technology, specifically praising IDIS's clean imagery, and admirably intuitive and straightforward configuration/installation.

Awards
IDIS has received multiple awards, honors, and recognition for successful business practices, growth, and technological innovations.

Locations
In addition to the IDIS headquarters and corporate offices outside Seoul, South Korea, IDIS maintains key offices with regional responsibilities throughout the world, including IDIS Europe, located near London, United Kingdom; IDIS Middle East, based in Dubai, United Arab Emirates; and IDIS America, located near Dallas, Texas, in the United States.

IDIS Holdings Co., Ltd.
The IDIS business falls under IDIS Holdings Co., Ltd., a parent company with annual turnover of more than $450M. The company's other subsidiaries include Kortek Corporation, a leading manufacturer of display technologies for industry use; HD PRO Co., Ltd., a video surveillance technology company; and IDP Corp., Ltd., which manufacturers ID card printers."

References

Companies based in Daejeon
Companies established in 1997
South Korean brands
Security technology
Video surveillance companies